Joseph Nicholas Flynn (December 29, 1861 – December 22, 1933) was a Major League Baseball outfielder. He played for the 1884 Philadelphia Keystones and Boston Reds in the Union Association.

Sources

Major League Baseball outfielders
Philadelphia Keystones players
Boston Reds (UA) players
Baseball players from Rhode Island
19th-century baseball players
1861 births
1933 deaths
Albany Senators players
Oswego Starchboxes players